Araucnephia is a genus of South American black flies from Chile and Argentina. There are only 2 known species.

Species
A. iberaensis Coscarón & Coscarón-Arias, 2002
A. montana (Philippi, 1865)

Literature cited

Simuliidae
Fauna of Chile
Fauna of Argentina
Insects of South America
Culicomorpha genera